The Invalids' Cemetery is one of the oldest cemeteries in Berlin. It  was the traditional resting place of the Prussian Army, and is regarded as particularly important as a memorial to the German Wars of Liberation of 1813–15.

History

The cemetery was established in 1748 to provide burial grounds for those veterans wounded in the War of the Austrian Succession, who inhabited a nearby hostel (Invalidenhaus) built on the orders of King Frederick the Great. A royal decree of 1824 declared that the Invalidenfriedhof should become the burial ground for all distinguished Prussian military personnel, including Bogislav Count Tauentzien von Wittenberg. One of the most notable tombs from this period is that of Gerhard von Scharnhorst (a hero of the Napoleonic Wars), designed by Schinkel with a sculpture of a slumbering lion cast out of captured cannon by Rauch. The cemetery was also the resting place of the soldiers killed during the Revolutions of 1848 in the German states. By 1872, approximately 18,000 funerals had taken place in the cemetery.

Numerous commanders and officers who fought in World War I, such as Max Hoffmann, Helmuth von Moltke, Ludwig von Falkenhausen and Karl von Bülow, were buried in the cemetery, along with several high-ranking members of the Freikorps. The body of Manfred von Richthofen (the 'Red Baron') was transferred to the cemetery in 1925 from his original grave in France. During the Weimar Republic, high-ranking military personnel such as Hans von Seeckt continued to be buried in the cemetery, but approximately half the graves were gardened over in this period.

During the Nazi regime, a number of senior figures were buried in the Invalid's Cemetery, including former Army Supreme Commander Werner von Fritsch, fighter ace Werner Mölders, Luftwaffe commander Ernst Udet, Munitions Minister Fritz Todt, Reichsprotector of Bohemia and Moravia Reinhard Heydrich, Field Marshal Walter von Reichenau, Colonel General Curt Haase and General Rudolf Schmundt, who was an adjutant to Adolf Hitler killed in the 20 July plot by the bomb intended for Hitler. After World War II, the Allies ordered that all Nazi monuments (including those in cemeteries) should be removed, and this resulted in the removal of the grave-markers of Heydrich and Todt, although their remains were not disinterred.

In May 1951, the East Berlin city council closed the cemetery off to the public so that repairs and restoration could be carried out, and to prevent any further damage of the graves.  Since it lay close to the Berlin Wall, in the 1960s over a third of the cemetery was destroyed to make way for watch towers, troop barracks, roads and parking lots. Some of the graves were damaged by gunfire from soldiers guarding the wall.

The degradation of the cemetery continued in the 1970s, when soldiers stationed nearby began to use abandoned or damaged gravestones to build shelters in case of bad weather. It was probably only the fact that the cemetery contained the graves of German freedom fighters like Scharnhorst, regarded by the East German National People's Army as its forerunners, that prevented its total destruction.

After German reunification in 1990 the cemetery came under the monument protection scheme and restoration work began. There is now a memorial to Berliners killed trying to cross the Berlin Wall in the cemetery. The cemetery also contains an unmarked mass grave of Berliners killed in allied Air Raids.

In December 2019 the unmarked grave of Reinhard Heydrich in the cemetery was opened, with police launching an investigation after a cemetery employee made the discovery. Stating that no remains had been removed, the police believe that whoever violated Heydrich's grave is thought to have had inside knowledge of its location.

Notable individuals
In chronological order (a fuller alpha-list is at :Category:Burials at the Invalids' Cemetery):
 1757 – Hans Karl von Winterfeldt
 1813 – Gerhard Johann David von Scharnhorst
 1824 – Bogislav Friedrich Emanuel Graf Tauentzien von Wittenberg
 1837 – Job von Witzleben
 1841 – Gustav von Rauch
 1843 (d. 1814) – Karl Friedrich Friesen
 1848 – Karl Friedrich von dem Knesebeck
 1848 – Hermann von Boyen
1850 – Friedrich Wilhelm von Rauch
 1856 – August Hiller von Gaertringen
 1878 – Therese Elssler (later Therese von Barnim)
 1881 – Karl Julius von Groß (later von Groß von Schwarzhoff)
 1892 – Fedor von Rauch
 1899 – Friedrich Wilhelm von Rauch
 1890 – Gustav Waldemar von Rauch
 1900 – Alfred Bonaventura von Rauch
 1901 – Albert von Rauch
 1909 – Friedrich von Holstein
 1910 – Julius von Verdy du Vernois
 1913 – Alfred von Schlieffen
 1914 – Karl von Schönberg
 1916 – Helmuth Johannes Ludwig von Moltke
 1917 – Moritz von Bissing
 1917 – Maximilian von Prittwitz und Gaffron
 1918 – Hans-Joachim Buddecke
 1918 – Hermann von Eichhorn
 1918 – Olivier Freiherr von Beaulieu-Marconnay
 1919 – Robert von Klüber
 1920 – Rudolf Berthold
 1921 – Hans Hartwig von Beseler
 1921 – Karl von Bülow
 1923 – Ernst Troeltsch
 1925–1975 (d. 1918) – Manfred Albrecht Freiherr von Richthofen
 1926 – Wolf Wilhelm Friedrich von Baudissin
 1926 – Josias von Heeringen
 1927 – Max Hoffmann
 1928 – Ulrich Neckel
 1933 – Hans Maikowski
 1933 – Werner von Frankenberg und Proschlitz
 1933 – Ludwig von Schröder
1935 – Friedrich von Rauch
 1936 – Ludwig von Falkenhausen
 1936 – Hans von Seeckt
 1937 – Adolf Karl von Oven
 1938 – Rochus Schmidt
 1939 – Oskar von Watter
 1939 – Werner von Fritsch
 1940 – Wolff von Stutterheim
 1941 – Lothar von Arnauld de la Perière
 1941 – Friedrich-Carl Cranz
 1941 – Ernst Udet
 1941 – Werner Mölders
 1942 – Walter von Reichenau
 1942 – Herbert Geitner
 1942 – Fritz Todt
 1942 – Hermann von der Lieth-Thomsen
 1942 – Reinhard Heydrich
 1942 – Carl August von Gablenz
 1943 – Curt Haase
 1944 – Hans-Valentin Hube
 1944 – Rudolf Schmundt
 1945 – Walter Marienfeld

References

 Thoms, Robert, Invalidenfriedhof Berlin Hamburg, 1999 
 Laurenz Demps, C. Scheer, H.-J. Mende, Invalidenfriedhof. Ein Friedhofsführer. Simon, Berlin 2007,

External links

 3d art project "Ghost – Memory Deconstructed" on the Invalid's Cemetery in Berlin
 

Cemeteries in Berlin
Prussian Army